Toby James Allchurch (born 1958 in Karachi) is an English former rugby union footballer. Allchurch represented England on the 1979 England rugby union tour of Japan, Fiji and Tonga.

Allchurch matriculated at Hatfield College, Durham in 1977 to read for a degree in General Arts, but was promoted to the Honours Course in Politics and Sociology. He graduated with a gentleman's degree in 1980.

According to Alastair Hignell, in the aftermath of the first match against Japan, Allchurch was involved in a bar brawl after being struck on the head by an ashtray thrown by a drunken Japanese fan. He was named to the bench for the second match against Japan and made his England debut as a flanker against Tonga in the final match of the tour, scoring one try.

Allchurch moved on from Durham to read Land Economy at Downing College, Cambridge, where he played for Cambridge University R.U.F.C. and later captained Rosslyn Park.

References

External links
 

1958 births
English rugby union players
Living people
Cambridge University R.U.F.C. players
Rosslyn Park F.C. players
Alumni of Downing College, Cambridge
Alumni of Hatfield College, Durham